Mohsen Abdel Hamid (born 1937 ) is an Iraqi politician and Islamic scholar who was a member of the Interim Iraq Governing Council (president, February 2004), created following the United States's 2003 invasion of Iraq. He served as the President of the Governing Council of Iraq (42nd Prime Minister of Iraq).

Biography 
Abdel Hamid was born in 1937 in Kirkuk and is of Kurdish background. He studied Islamic Law in Cairo and returned to Iraq in 1986 to work as a professor at Baghdad University. Abdel Hamid has written over 30 books on interpretation of the Qur'an. He was arrested in 1996 by the government of Saddam Hussein but opposed the 2003 invasion of Iraq.

Until 2004 he was the secretary general of the Iraqi Islamic Party, the largest Sunni party in Iraq, and as a result was appointed to the Iraqi Governing Council.

On May 30, 2005, Abdel Hamid was mistakenly arrested by U.S. troops.

Personal website 
 https://web.archive.org/web/20150402134446/http://drmohsinah.com/

References 

1937 births
Iraqi Sunni Muslims
Living people
Iraqi Muslim Brotherhood members
People from Kirkuk
Iraqi Islamic Party politicians
Iraqi Kurdish people
Academic staff of the University of Baghdad
International Union of Muslim Scholars members